This is a list of libraries in Angola.

Libraries 

 National Library of Angola (84,000 volumes)
 Agostinho Neto University Library (75,000 volumes)
 Luanda Municipal Library (30,000 volumes)
 Geological and Mining Services Directorate Library (40,000 volumes)
 National Historical Center Library (12,000 volumes)

See also 
 List of museums in Angola

References 

 
Angola
Libraries
Libraries